Jason Christopher McAddley (born July 28, 1979) is a former American football wide receiver. He played his high school football at Oak Ridge High School in Oak Ridge, Tennessee and went to the University of Alabama.

He was drafted by the Arizona Cardinals in the fifth round (149th overall) in the 2002 NFL Draft. He played for the Cardinals for two years. He was signed as a free agent by the Tennessee Titans in 2004. He then signed with 49ers in 2005. He was signed by the Redskins before the 2007 season.

References

1979 births
Living people
People from Brooklyn
American football wide receivers
Alabama Crimson Tide football players
Arizona Cardinals players
Tennessee Titans players
San Francisco 49ers players
Washington Redskins players